The Convention on the Physical Protection of Nuclear Material was adopted on 26 October 1979 in Vienna, Austria. The initial signing ceremony took place in Vienna and at New York on 3 March 1980, and the convention entered into force on 8 February 1987. The convention is deposited with the International Atomic Energy Agency. In July 2005 a diplomatic conference was convened to amend the convention and strengthen its provisions, as a result of which it was renamed the Convention on the Physical Protection of Nuclear Material and Nuclear Facilities.

As of October 2018, there are 157 state parties to the convention plus the European Atomic Energy Community.

Upon accession, 38 countries declared themself as not bound by the provisions of Article 17 paragraph 2 and did not accept the competence of the International Court of Justice in settlement of the disputes. Five countries withdrew these objections thereafter.

The United States Department of State says that:

References

External links
 The Convention on the Physical Protection of Nuclear Material on the website of the International Atomic Energy Agency.
Staff. Convention on the Physical Protection of Nuclear Material, website of the Council on Foreign Relations, Accessed 19 January 2008. Quotes the amendment made at the July 2005 conference and states that it will go into force when it has been ratified by two-thirds of the Parties to the CPPNM.
Ratifications and status.

Treaties concluded in 1980
Treaties entered into force in 1987
Arms control treaties
Terrorism treaties
Nuclear safety and security
Treaties of the Afghan Transitional Administration
Treaties of Albania
Treaties of Algeria
Treaties of Andorra
Treaties of Antigua and Barbuda
Treaties of Argentina
Treaties of Armenia
Treaties of Australia
Treaties of Austria
Treaties of Azerbaijan
Treaties of the Bahamas
Treaties of Bahrain
Treaties of Bangladesh
Treaties of Belarus
Treaties of Belgium
Treaties of Bolivia
Treaties of Bosnia and Herzegovina
Treaties of Botswana
Treaties of Brazil
Treaties of Burkina Faso
Treaties of Cambodia
Treaties of Cameroon
Treaties of Canada
Treaties of Cape Verde
Treaties of the Central African Republic
Treaties of Chile
Treaties of the People's Republic of China
Treaties of Colombia
Treaties of the Comoros
Treaties of Costa Rica
Treaties of Ivory Coast
Treaties of Croatia
Treaties of Cuba
Treaties of Cyprus
Treaties of Czechoslovakia
Treaties of the Czech Republic
Treaties of the Democratic Republic of the Congo
Treaties of Denmark
Treaties of Djibouti
Treaties of Dominica
Treaties of the Dominican Republic
Treaties of Ecuador
Treaties of El Salvador
Treaties of Equatorial Guinea
Treaties of Estonia
Treaties of Fiji
Treaties of Finland
Treaties of France
Treaties of Gabon
Treaties of Georgia (country)
Treaties of West Germany
Treaties of Ghana
Treaties of Greece
Treaties of Grenada
Treaties of Guatemala
Treaties of Guinea
Treaties of Guinea-Bissau
Treaties of Guyana
Treaties of Haiti
Treaties of Honduras
Treaties of Iceland
Treaties of India
Treaties of Indonesia
Treaties of Iraq
Treaties of Ireland
Treaties of Israel
Treaties of Italy
Treaties of Jamaica
Treaties of Japan
Treaties of Jordan
Treaties of Kazakhstan
Treaties of Kenya
Treaties of Kuwait
Treaties of Kyrgyzstan
Treaties of Laos
Treaties of Latvia
Treaties of Lebanon
Treaties of Lesotho
Treaties of the Libyan Arab Jamahiriya
Treaties of Liechtenstein
Treaties of Lithuania
Treaties of Luxembourg
Treaties of Madagascar
Treaties of Malawi
Treaties of Mali
Treaties of Malta
Treaties of the Marshall Islands
Treaties of Mauritania
Treaties of Mexico
Treaties of Monaco
Treaties of Montenegro
Treaties of Morocco
Treaties of Mozambique
Treaties of Myanmar
Treaties of Namibia
Treaties of Nauru
Treaties of the Netherlands
Treaties of New Zealand
Treaties of Nicaragua
Treaties of Niger
Treaties of Nigeria
Treaties of Niue
Treaties of Norway
Treaties of Oman
Treaties of Pakistan
Treaties of the State of Palestine
Treaties of Palau
Treaties of Panama
Treaties of Paraguay
Treaties of Peru
Treaties of the Philippines
Treaties of Portugal
Treaties of Qatar
Treaties of South Korea
Treaties of Moldova
Treaties of Romania
Treaties of Rwanda
Treaties of San Marino
Treaties of Saudi Arabia
Treaties of Senegal
Treaties of Serbia and Montenegro
Treaties of Seychelles
Treaties of Singapore
Treaties of Slovakia
Treaties of Slovenia
Treaties of South Africa
Treaties of Spain
Treaties of Saint Kitts and Nevis
Treaties of Saint Lucia
Treaties of the Republic of the Sudan (1985–2011)
Treaties of Eswatini
Treaties of Sweden
Treaties of Switzerland
Treaties of Tajikistan
Treaties of North Macedonia
Treaties of Thailand
Treaties of Togo
Treaties of Tonga
Treaties of Trinidad and Tobago
Treaties of Tunisia
Treaties of Turkey
Treaties of Turkmenistan
Treaties of Uganda
Treaties of Ukraine
Treaties of the United Arab Emirates
Treaties of the United Kingdom
Treaties of Tanzania
Treaties of the United States
Treaties of Uruguay
Treaties of Uzbekistan
Treaties of Vietnam
Treaties of Yemen
Treaties of Yugoslavia
Treaties of Zambia
Treaties entered into by the European Atomic Energy Community
Physical Protection of Nuclear Materials Convention
Treaties extended to the Faroe Islands
Treaties extended to Greenland
Treaties extended to Aruba
Treaties extended to Jersey
Treaties extended to Guernsey
Treaties extended to the Isle of Man